Kirehe is a district (akarere) in Eastern Province, Rwanda. Its capital is Kirehe town (which is usually known as Rusumo, being the major settlement of the former Rusumo district).

Geography 
The district comprises areas in the far south-eastern corner of Rwanda, bordering Tanzania and Burundi. Its most noteworthy feature is Rusumo Falls, the waterfall on the Kagera River, which has been key to Rwandan history.

Climate

The district is characterized by savanna, acacia trees and few natural forests, these and the existence of the Kagera River contributes to a temperate climate in the region.

Sectors 
Kirehe district is divided into 12 sectors (imirenge): Gahara, Gatore, Kigarama, Kigina, Kirehe, Mahama, Mpanga, Musaza, Mushikiri, Nasho, Nyamugari, Nyarubuye.

External links 
 
 Kirehe District government website
 

 
Eastern Province, Rwanda
Districts of Rwanda